Elliot Lake Secondary School (ELSS) is a high school in Elliot Lake, Ontario, Canada. The school began in 1956 with 23 students and quickly grew to 1193 students by 1990. The following year, the school only saw an enrollment of 899 students and the institution's population would continue to drop thereafter. , the enrolment was 290.

In the 2021 Fraser Institute Ontario secondary school report cards, Elliot Lake Secondary School ranked 664/739 schools in Ontario.

See also
List of high schools in Ontario

References

External links
 

High schools in Algoma District
Education in Elliot Lake
1957 establishments in Ontario
Educational institutions established in 1957